La Bollène-Vésubie is a commune in the Alpes-Maritimes department in the Provence-Alpes-Cote-d'Azur region in southeastern France.

Its inhabitants are called Bollénois; in the Niçois dialect of Langue d'Oc the name is la Boulèna, the inhabitants lu Boulenasc.

Population

See also
Communes of the Alpes-Maritimes department

References

External links 
 Official site  
 La Vésubie forum

Communes of Alpes-Maritimes
Monte Carlo Rally